Tommy Dunker (born 26 June 1969) is a former speedway rider who competed in speedway, Longtrack and Grasstrack Racing. He competed in the first One World Longtrack world championship Grand-Prix series in 1997 and won the title.

World Longtrack Championship

Grand-Prix Years
 1997 5 app (Champion) 89pts

Best World Longtrack Grand-Prix Result
  Pfarrkirchen First 1997

Semi-finals
 1991  Scheeßel (9th) 10pts
 1996  Pfarrkirchen (14th) 3pts
 1998  Marianske Lazne (N/S)

Qualifying round
 1988  Herxheim (16th) 1pt
 1988  Harsewinkel (N/S)

World final appearances

World Pairs Championship
 1988 -  Bradford, Odsal Stadium (with Gerd Riss) - 8th - 21pts (4)

External links
 http://grasstrackgb.co.uk/tommy-dunker/
 https://www.glasgowtigers.co/kaiser-kev-a-tiger/
 http://speedway.com.pl/riders/tommy-dunker/
 http://www.heraldscotland.com/news/11949170.Religion_in_sport_that_puts_culture_vultures_in_a_spin/
 http://www.speedwayplus.com/WorldPairs1988.shtml

1969 births
German speedway riders
Living people
German expatriate sportspeople in Poland
Individual Speedway Long Track World Championship riders
People from Neumünster
Sportspeople from Schleswig-Holstein